Statistics of the Scottish Football League in season 1966–67.

Scottish League Division One

Scottish League Division Two

See also
1966–67 in Scottish football

References

 
Scottish Football League seasons